The Fellsmere Frog Leg Festival is a city fundraiser held annually in Fellsmere, Florida in the third week of January. The first festival, proposed by Fran Adams and other local residents, was planned in 1990 in order to increase the funds of Fellsmere's recreation department. Since that time, festival attendance has grown tremendously and the city of Fellsmere continues to benefit from it.

In 2006, the festival took place from January 19–22; in 2007 it took place January 18–21. In 2008, it was held January 17–20. The festival is planned for 19–22 January 2023.

Since 2021, strict measures are in place, such as wearing masks & social distancing to combat the COVID-19 pandemic.

See also
List of festivals in Florida

References

External links 
 
 Food Fest! Your Complete Guide to Florida's Food Festivals

Festivals in Florida
Food and drink festivals in the United States
Tourist attractions in Indian River County, Florida
1990 establishments in Florida
Recurring events established in 1990